The 2020 Prairie View A&M Panthers football team represented Prairie View A&M University in the 2020 NCAA Division I FCS football season. The Panthers were led by third-year head coach Eric Dooley and played their home games at Panther Stadium at Blackshear Field in Prairie View, Texas as members of the West Division of the Southwestern Athletic Conference (SWAC).

On July 20, 2020, the Southwestern Athletic Conference announced that it would not play fall sports due to the COVID-19 pandemic, which includes the football program. The conference formalized plans to conduct a competitive schedule for football during the 2021 spring semester.

Previous season

The Panthers finished the 2019 season 6–5, 4–3 in SWAC play to finish in third place in the West Division.

Schedule
Due to the SWAC's postponement of the 2020 football season to spring 2021, games against Louisiana Tech, Northwestern State, and TCU were canceled. The SWAC released updated spring schedules on August 17.

Game summaries

Texas Southern

vs. Grambling State

at Arkansas–Pine Bluff

References

Prairie View AandM
Prairie View A&M Panthers football seasons
Prairie View AandM football